Tengiz Burjanadze Stadium is a multi-use stadium in Gori, Georgia.  It is used mostly for football matches and is the home stadium of FC Dila Gori. The stadium is able to hold 5,000 people.

It is named after Tengiz Burjanadze.

Gallery

See also 
 Stadiums in Georgia

External links
Stadium at soccerway.com

Sports venues in Georgia (country)
Football venues in Georgia (country)
Buildings and structures in Gori, Georgia